Mica Creek is a suburb in the City of Mount Isa, Queensland, Australia.

Geography 
The Leichhard River flows north–south through the town of Mount Isa, dividing the suburbs of the town into "mineside" (west of the Leichhardt River) and "townside" (east of the Leichhardt River). Mica Creek is a "mineside" suburb.

History 
Mica Creek was named on 1 September 1973 by the Queensland Place Names Board.  On 16 March 2001 the status of Mica Creek was changed from a locality to a suburb.

References 

City of Mount Isa
Suburbs in Queensland